Živa Kraus (born 4 October 1945 in Zagreb, Croatia, Yugoslavia) is a Croatian painter.

Early life 
Kraus was born in Zagreb to a Jewish family, father Ivo Kraus and mother Herma (née Delpin). Her twin brother is Ognjen Kraus, president of the Jewish community in Zagreb.

Education and later years 
She studied painting at the Academy of Fine Arts Zagreb, where she organized her first solo exhibition. In the 1970 Kraus was the assistant to Peggy Guggenheim. Kraus is the owner of the Ikona gallery in Venice, Italy, where she came in 1971. She currently resides in Venice.

See also 
 Ognjen Kraus

References

Bibliography 

 

1945 births
Living people
Artists from Zagreb
Croatian Jews
Croatian people of Czech-Jewish descent
Academy of Fine Arts, University of Zagreb alumni
20th-century Croatian painters
21st-century Croatian painters
Jewish painters
Croatian expatriates in Italy